Joseph Wilson (born 2 December 1939) is a Ghanaian footballer. He competed in the men's tournament at the 1968 Summer Olympics.

References

External links
 

1939 births
Living people
Ghanaian footballers
Ghana international footballers
Olympic footballers of Ghana
Footballers at the 1968 Summer Olympics
1968 African Cup of Nations players
People from Cape Coast
Association football midfielders